St. Vincent de Paul Catholic Church is located in Bayonne, Hudson County, New Jersey, United States. It is an active parish of the Archdiocese of Newark, in Deanery 13. It is noted for its historic parish church, which was added to the National Register of Historic Places on August 24, 2011.

The parish was established in 1894, primarily serving Irish, Scottish and German immigrants in the area. In 1905, the congregation moved from the rented hall it had been using to a new wooden Gothic Revival church. In 1927, work began on the current Lombardy Romanesque church, which was completed in 1930.

Architecture
The building was designed by the ecclesiastical architectural firm Maginnis & Walsh of Boston. The granite Romanesque Revival style structure replaced the older Gothic structure, which was deemed impractical. There are more than 40 stained glass windows in the church and rectory that were made in Dublin, Ireland in the Harry Clarke Studio, in order to tell the history of the parish. No other examples of his work survive anywhere in North America.

The organ was built by the Hinners Organ Company in 1930. It originally had electro-pneumatic action and was rebuilt in 1993 with a computerized/digital system in 1993.

As a tribute to the early Irish parishioners that were the cornerstone of the Church the workers carved a Celtic cross in a cut-stone found at the top of the Church's front facade.

See also
National Register of Historic Places listings in Hudson County, New Jersey

References

Churches in Bayonne, New Jersey
German-American culture in New Jersey
Irish-American culture in New Jersey
Roman Catholic churches completed in 1930
Churches on the National Register of Historic Places in New Jersey
National Register of Historic Places in Hudson County, New Jersey
New Jersey Register of Historic Places
Religious organizations established in 1894
20th-century Roman Catholic church buildings in the United States